African Litany is the second studio album from South African band Juluka, released in 1981. It features lyrics sung in English and Zulu.

The first track, Impi, which became one of the band's hits, retells the story of the Battle of Isandlwana, won by the Zulu, and was banned from the radio in South Africa at the time, but gained underground popularity. It remains a cult classic in South Africa and has now become mainstream to the point of often been associated with international sports events, in particular rugby.

Track listing 
 "Impi" (Clegg)
 "African Sky Blue" (Clegg, Mchunu)
 "Jarusalema" (Clegg)
 "African Litany" (Clegg)
 "Bull-Man-Free" (Clegg, Mchunu)
 "Gijim'beke" (Mchunu)
 "Heart of the Dancer" (Clegg)
 "High Country" (Clegg)
 "Mama Shabalala" (Clegg)
 "Thandiwe" (Mchunu)

Personnel 
 Johnny Clegg - vocals, guitar
 Sipho Mchunu - guitar, percussion, vocals
 Johnny Boshoff - bass guitar, percussion, vocals
 Derek de Beer - drums, percussion, vocals
 Robbie Jansen - flute, saxophone, vocals

Additional personnel
 Umvovo Shelembe - vocals
 Umncengeni Ngubane - vocals

References 

1981 albums
Juluka albums